"Magneto and Titanium Man" is a 1975 song by Wings. It is the B-side of the "Venus and Mars/Rock Show" single.

Lyrics
The song is in narrative form, and includes the Marvel Comics characters Magneto, Titanium Man and the Crimson Dynamo in its story. When asked his opinion of the song decades after its release, Stan Lee (who co-created all three characters) said he thought it was "terrific."

Personnel
Paul McCartney — vocals, bass, guitars, piano, keyboards
Linda McCartney —  keyboards, backing vocals
Denny Laine — guitars, backing vocals
Jimmy McCulloch – guitars
Joe English — drums

Live
The song was included in the setlist for the band's 1975/1976 world tours. While it was performed, comic art of Magneto, created by Stan Lee and Jack Kirby, and Titanium Man & the Crimson Dynamo, created by Stan Lee and Don Heck, was projected onto the large screen behind the band. The Magneto figure on the backdrop is by George Tuska and John Tartaglione from X-Men #43 (April 1968, on sale February, 1968), the Titanium Man is by George Tuska and Mike Esposito from Iron Man #22 (February 1970, on sale December 1969), and the Crimson Dynamo is by Sal Buscema and Joe Staton from Avengers #130 (December 1974, on sale October 1974). The two backdrop figures are reversed from their original Comic Book presentation.

McCartney, a Marvel Comics fan and comic book fan in general, met with Kirby on the L.A. leg of the tour, giving him front row seats and back stage passes (his daughter was a big Wings and Beatles fan), and Kirby backstage gave Paul and Linda an original comic drawing he did of them.

The song can be heard coming from a radio, creating an argument, in a scene in the 1976 Mike Leigh play Nuts in May.

The Roots played the song as walk-on music for Michael Fassbender for his appearance on The Tonight Show with Jimmy Fallon during his promotional tour for X-Men: Days of Future Past.

References

1975 singles
Paul McCartney songs
Paul McCartney and Wings songs
Songs written by Paul McCartney
Song recordings produced by Paul McCartney
Capitol Records singles
Music published by MPL Music Publishing
1975 songs
Songs about comics
Songs about fictional male characters
Songs about superheroes
Bank robbery in fiction
Works based on Marvel Comics